Cud is the portion of food regurgitated by a ruminant.

Cud or CUD may also refer to:
 Cámara Uruguaya de Productores de Fonogramas y Videogramas, a Uruguayan non-profit organization
 Cannabis use disorder
 Coalition for Unity and Democracy, an Ethiopian political party
 Connected Urban Development, a private/public partnership, initiated in 2006
 Cud (band), an indie rock band formed in Leeds, England in 1987
 Cud, a lump of metal on a coin caused by a die defect
 Cursor Down (ANSI), an ANSI X3.64 escape sequence
 Primary carnitine deficiency, an inability to utilize fat for energy
 Caloundra Airport, IATA airport code "CUD"

See also
 CUDA, a parallel computing architecture
 Digestion